Rachel Ames, née Stainer (London, 1 October 1915 – Petronell, Austria, 24 November 1999) was a British novelist and journalist who wrote under the pseudonym Sarah Gainham. She is perhaps best known for her 1967 novel Night Falls on the City, the first of a trilogy about life in Vienna under Nazi rule.

Life
Rachel Stainer was born in Islington. After her father Tom died in World War I, the family moved to Newbury, Berkshire.

After an "impulsive and unsuccessful wartime liaison", in 1947 she moved to Vienna to work with the Four Power Commission, and married the journalist Antony Terry. Terry was German correspondent for the Sunday Times, and the marriage "fell victim to his workload".

Stainer never returned to England, living in Berlin, Bonn and Trieste before returning to Vienna. In 1956 Cyril Ray helped secure her a job as Central and Eastern Europe Correspondent for The Spectator, making a plea that she needed the money. Writing as Sarah Gainham (the name of her maternal great-grandmother), she reported on Germany and the German-speaking parts of Central Europe until 1966. She soon published her first novel, Time Right Deadly (1956), a semi-autobiographical account of an unsuccessful affair. The novel was followed by several other spy thrillers set in Europe. Here Gainham drew on her own knowledge of Cold War spies and intrigues: Terry, hired to the Sunday Times by Ian Fleming, may have been an MI6 agent, and Gainham herself apparently researched a document 'East-West Routes for Agents', commissioned by Fleming, on how to gain access to West Berlin from East Berlin.

In 1964 her marriage to Terry was dissolved, and she married Kenneth Ames, Central European correspondent of The Economist. Night Falls on the City (1967), a tale of love and betrayal set in wartime Vienna, achieved significant commercial success: it topped the New York Times bestseller list for several months, and was widely translated. It was the first novel of a trilogy, completed by A Place in the Country (1969) and Private Worlds (1971), and gave her financial security.

In 1975 Ames committed suicide, leaving Gainham alone in later life. In 1976 she moved from Vienna to a small house in Petronell-Carnuntum, on the banks of the Danube, and became a somewhat eccentric recluse. Her last novel was the heavily autobiographical but unsuccessful The Tiger, Life (1983). In 1984 she was made a Fellow of the Royal Society of Literature. A Discursive Essay on the Presentation of Recent History in England was privately published in 1999.

Works
 Time Right Deadly. London: Arthur Barker, 1956.
 The Cold Dark Night. London: Arthur Barker, 1957.
 The Mythmaker. London: Arthur Barker, 1957.
 The Stone Roses. London: Eyre & Spottiswoode, 1958.
 (tr.) The Voice of Fear: ten poems by E. G. Molnár. Translated from the German of Illa Kovarik and Tibor Simányi, with drawings by Hugo Matzenauer. Vienna: Ars Hungarica, 1959.
 The Silent Hostage. London: Eyre & Spottiswoode, 1960.
 Night Falls on the City. London: Collins, 1967.
 A Place in the Country. London: Weidenfeld & Nicolson, 1969.
 Takeover Bid: a tale. London: Weidenfeld and Nicolson, 1970.
 Private Worlds. London: Weidenfeld & Nicolson, 1971.
 Maculan's Daughter. London: Macmillan, 1973.
 To the Opera Ball. London: Macmillan, 1975.
 The Habsburg Twilight: tales from Vienna. London: Weidenfeld and Nicolson, 1979.
 The Tiger, Life. London: Methuen, 1983.
 A Discursive Essay on the Presentation of Recent History in England.  New Millennium, 1999.

References

External links
 Women Writers Revisited: Kate Mosse on Sarah Gainham

1915 births
1999 deaths
20th-century British novelists
20th-century British women writers
English reporters and correspondents
English women journalists
Journalists from London
British foreign correspondents
20th-century British journalists
20th-century English women
20th-century English people
British expatriates in Austria
British expatriates in Germany